This is a list of American films released in 1969.

Midnight Cowboy won the Academy Award for Best Picture.



A–B

C–G

H–M

N–S

T–Z

Documentaries and shorts

See also
 1969 in the United States

External links

 1969 films at the Internet Movie Database
 List of 1969 box office number-one films in the United States

1969
Films
Lists of 1969 films by country or language